Monodonta nebulosa is a species of sea snail, a marine gastropod mollusk in the family Trochidae, the top snails.

Description
The shell size varies between 15 mm and 22 mm, the body volume is 1.46 cm^3,  and the wet body mass is 2.55 grams. The species is a grazer, and eats mostly on low growing organisms, for example: grasses, forbs or algae.

Distribution
This species is distributed around the Red Sea and the Eastern Indian Ocean.

References

 Vine, P. (1986). Red Sea Invertebrates. Immel Publishing, London. 224 pp
 Bosch D.T., Dance S.P., Moolenbeek R.G. & Oliver P.G. (1995) Seashells of eastern Arabia. Dubai: Motivate Publishing. 296 pp. 
 Donald K.M., Kennedy M. & Spencer H.G. (2005) The phylogeny and taxonomy of austral monodontine topshells (Mollusca: Gastropoda: Trochidae), inferred from DNA sequences. Molecular Phylogenetics and Evolution 37: 474–483

External links
 

nebulosa
Molluscs described in 1775